The 1946–47 New York Knicks season was the first season of the franchise in the National Basketball Association (NBA). The Knicks, the shortened form of Knickerbockers, named for Father Knickerbocker (a popular symbol of New York), are  one of only two teams of the original National Basketball Association still located in its original city (the other being the Boston Celtics). The Knickerbockers first head coach was Neil Cohalan.

Roster

Regular season
The Knicks' (and the BAA's) first game was played on November 1, 1946, against the Toronto Huskies as the New York Knickerbockers at Toronto's Maple Leaf Gardens, where the Knickerbockers won 68–66.

Season standings

Record vs. opponents

Game log

|- align="center" bgcolor="#ccffcc" 
| 1 || November 1 || @ Toronto || W 68–66 || Maple Leaf Gardens || Leo Gottlieb (14) || 1–0
|- align="center" bgcolor="ffcccc"
| 2 || November 2 || @ Chicago || L 47–63 || Chicago Stadium || Leo Gottlieb (12) || 1–1
|- align="center" bgcolor="#ccffcc" 
| 3 || November 7 || @ St. Louis || W 68–63 || St. Louis Arena || Hertzberg, Schectman (11) || 2–1
|- align="center" bgcolor="ffcccc"
| 4 || November 11 || Chicago || L 68–78 (OT) || Madison Square Garden || Sonny Hertzberg (19) || 2–2
|- align="center" bgcolor="#ccffcc" 
| 5 || November 16 || Pittsburgh || W 64–62 (OT) || Madison Square Garden || Kaplowitz, Schectman (14) || 3–2
|- align="center" bgcolor="#ccffcc" 
| 6 || November 18 || Detroit || W 61–57 || Madison Square Garden || Sonny Hertzberg (14) || 4–2
|- align="center" bgcolor="#ccffcc" 
| 7 || November 20 || Chicago || W 72–69 || Madison Square Garden || Sonny Hertzberg (19) || 5–2
|- align="center" bgcolor="#ccffcc" 
| 8 || November 23 || Cleveland || W 82–76 (OT) || Madison Square Garden || Sonny Hertzberg (18) || 6–2
|- align="center" bgcolor="#ccffcc" 
| 9 || November 25 || @ Pittsburgh || W 62–46 || Duquesne Gardens || Stan Stutz (15) || 7–2
|- align="center" bgcolor="#ccffcc" 
| 10 || November 27 || St. Louis || W 67–60 || Madison Square Garden || Tommy Byrnes (17) || 8–2
|- align="center" bgcolor="#ccffcc" 
| 11 || November 28 || @ Providence || W 60–58 || Rhode Island Auditorium || Tommy Byrnes (18) || 9–2
|- align="center" bgcolor="#ccffcc" 
| 12 || November 30 || Philadelphia || W 64–60 (OT) || Madison Square Garden || Tommy Byrnes (17) || 10–2
|-

|- align="center" bgcolor="#ccffcc"
| 13 || December 4 || Detroit || W 70–57 || Madison Square Garden || Ralph Kaplowitz (15) || 11–2
|- align="center" bgcolor="#ffcccc"
| 14 || December 5 || @ Philadelphia || L 51–62 || Philadelphia Arena || Ralph Kaplowitz (13) || 11–3
|- align="center" bgcolor="#ccffcc"
| 15 || December 7 || @ Boston || W 90–65 || Boston Garden || Stan Stutz (29) || 12–3
|- align="center" bgcolor="#ccffcc"
| 16 || December 8 || Boston || W 62–44 || Madison Square Garden || Stan Stutz (21) || 13–3
|- align="center" bgcolor="#ccffcc"
| 17 || December 11 || Providence || W 83–68 || Madison Square Garden || Sonny Hertzberg (16) || 14–3
|- align="center" bgcolor="#ffcccc"
| 18 || December 15 || @ Cleveland || L 52–70 || Cleveland Arena || Sonny Hertzberg (16) || 14–4
|- align="center" bgcolor="#ffcccc"
| 19 || December 18 || Cleveland || L 53–56 || Madison Square Garden || Leo Gottlieb (9) || 14–5
|- align="center" bgcolor="#ffcccc"
| 20 || December 20 || @ Toronto || L 70–74 || Maple Leaf Gardens || Sonny Hertzberg (22) || 14–6
|- align="center" bgcolor="#ffcccc"
| 21 || December 21 || @ Providence || L 61–63 || Rhode Island Auditorium || Stan Stutz (17) || 14–7
|- align="center" bgcolor="#ffcccc"
| 22 || December 28 || @ Washington || L 49–70 || Uline Arena || Sonny Hertzberg (12) || 14–8
|-

|- align="center" bgcolor="#ccffcc"
| 23 || January 4 || @ Detroit || W 62–50 || Detroit Olympia || Leo Gottlieb (22) || 15–8
|- align="center" bgcolor="#ccffcc"
| 24 || January 5 || @ St. Louis || W 59–57 || St. Louis Arena || Leo Gottlieb (21) || 16–8
|- align="center" bgcolor="#ffcccc"
| 25 || January 8 || Toronto || L 63–76 || Madison Square Garden || Leo Gottlieb (16) || 16–9
|- align="center" bgcolor="#ffcccc"
| 26 || January 10 || @ Boston || L 62–66 || Boston Garden || Bob Cluggish (10) || 16–10
|- align="center" bgcolor="#ccffcc"
| 27 || January 13 || @ Pittsburgh || W 53–50 || Duquesne Gardens || Ossie Schectman (19) || 17–10
|- align="center" bgcolor="#ffcccc"
| 28 || January 15 || Washington || L 63–65 || Madison Square Garden || Ossie Schectman (19) || 17–11
|- align="center" bgcolor="#ffcccc"
| 29 || January 18 || Boston || L 45–58 || Madison Square Garden || Sonny Hertzberg (10) || 17–12
|- align="center" bgcolor="#ffcccc"
| 30 || January 19 || @ Cleveland || L 72–79 || Cleveland Arena || Tommy Byrnes (18) || 17–13
|- align="center" bgcolor="#ccffcc"
| 31 || January 22 || Chicago || W 74–64 || Madison Square Garden || Tommy Byrnes (22) || 18–13
|- align="center" bgcolor="#ffcccc"
| 32 || January 25 || Boston || L 46–52 || Madison Square Garden || Bud Palmer (12) || 18–14
|- align="center" bgcolor="#ccffcc"
| 33 || January 29 || Pittsburgh || W 64–60 || Madison Square Garden || Bud Palmer (13) || 19–14
|- align="center" bgcolor="#ffcccc"
| 34 || January 30 || @ Philadelphia || L 58–65 || Philadelphia Arena || Bud Palmer (16) || 19–15
|-

|- align="center" bgcolor="#ffcccc"
| 35 || February 1 || Philadelphia || L 63–71 || Madison Square Garden || Palmer, Schectman (12) || 19–16
|- align="center" bgcolor="#ffcccc"
| 36 || February 2 || @ Detroit || L 63–65 || Detroit Olympia || Stan Stutz (22) || 19–17
|- align="center" bgcolor="#ffcccc"
| 37 || February 5 || St. Louis || L 46–71 || Madison Square Garden || Stan Stutz (8) || 19–18
|- align="center" bgcolor="#ffcccc"
| 38 || February 6 || @ Boston || L 48–49 || Boston Garden || Leo Gottlieb (8) || 19–19
|- align="center" bgcolor="#ccffcc"
| 39 || February 8 || Toronto || W 69–46 || Madison Square Garden || Bud Palmer (16) || 20–19
|- align="center" bgcolor="#ccffcc"
| 40 || February 12 || Washington || W 76–72 || Madison Square Garden || Lee Knorek (21) || 21–19
|- align="center" bgcolor="#ffcccc"
| 41 || February 15 || Cleveland || L 84–90 || Madison Square Garden || Ossie Schectman (18) || 21–20
|- align="center" bgcolor="#ccffcc"
| 42 || February 16 || @ Detroit || W 66–58 || Detroit Olympia || Palmer, Stutz (14) || 22–20
|- align="center" bgcolor="#ffcccc"
| 43 || February 19 || Providence || L 62–69 || Madison Square Garden || Ossie Schectman (16) || 22–21
|- align="center" bgcolor="#ccffcc"
| 44 || February 21 || Pittsburgh || W 77–49 || Madison Square Garden || Bud Palmer (15) || 23–21
|- align="center" bgcolor="#ffcccc"
| 45 || February 23 || @ Chicago || L 68–82 || Chicago Stadium || Ossie Schectman (18) || 23–22
|- align="center" bgcolor="#ffcccc"
| 46 || February 26 || Washington || L 60–84 || Madison Square Garden || Bud Palmer (13) || 23–23
|- align="center" bgcolor="#ccffcc"
| 47 || February 27 || @ Providence || W 73–65 || Rhode Island Auditorium || Stan Stutz (19) || 24–23
|-

|- align="center" bgcolor="#ccffcc"
| 48 || March 1 || Toronto || W 63–48 || Madison Square Garden || Bud Palmer (15) || 25–23
|- align="center" bgcolor="#ccffcc"
| 49 || March 6 || @ Philadelphia || W 61–59 || Philadelphia Arena || Ossie Schectman (14) || 26–23
|- align="center" bgcolor="#ccffcc"
| 50 || March 8 || Detroit || W 64–61 || Madison Square Garden || Bud Palmer (11) || 27–23
|- align="center" bgcolor="#ccffcc"
| 51 || March 13 || St. Louis || W 78–74 (2OT) || Madison Square Garden || Knorek, Stutz (20) || 28–23
|- align="center" bgcolor="#ffcccc"
| 52 || March 15 || @ Washington || L 63–78 || Uline Arena || Leo Gottlieb (12) || 28–24
|- align="center" bgcolor="#ccffcc"
| 53 || March 16 || @ Cleveland || W 81–69 || Cleveland Arena || Sonny Hertzberg (21) || 29–24
|- align="center" bgcolor="#ccffcc"
| 54 || March 19 || @ Chicago || W 65–57 || Chicago Stadium || Sonny Hertzberg (16) || 30–24
|- align="center" bgcolor="#ffcccc"
| 55 || March 20 || @ St. Louis || L 49–51 || St. Louis Arena || Bud Palmer (11) || 30–25
|- align="center" bgcolor="#ccffcc"
| 56 || March 22 || @ Washington || W 68–63 || Uline Arena || Sonny Hertzberg (23) || 31–25
|- align="center" bgcolor="#ccffcc"
| 57 || March 24 || @ Pittsburgh || W 65–51 || Duquesne Gardens || Bud Palmer (20) || 32–25
|- align="center" bgcolor="#ccffcc"
| 58 || March 26 || Providence || W 91–84 (2OT) || Madison Square Garden || Tommy Byrnes (22) || 33–25
|- align="center" bgcolor="#ffcccc"
| 59 || March 28 || @ Toronto || L 61–71 || Maple Leaf Gardens || Tommy Byrnes (14) || 33–26
|- align="center" bgcolor="#ffcccc"
| 60 || March 30 || @ Philadelphia || L 72–76 || Philadelphia Arena || Lee Knorek (17) || 33–27
|-

|-
| 1946–47 Schedule

Playoffs

|- align="center" bgcolor="#ffcccc"
| 1
| April 2
| @ Cleveland
| L 51–77
| Lee Knorek (10)
| Cleveland Arena
| 0–1
|- align="center" bgcolor="#ccffcc"
| 2
| April 5
| Cleveland
| W 86–74
| Stan Stutz (30)
| Madison Square Garden III10,321
| 1–1
|- align="center" bgcolor="#ccffcc"
| 3
| April 9
| Cleveland
| W 93–71
| Bud Palmer (26)
| Madison Square Garden III5,124
| 2–1
|-

|- align="center" bgcolor="#ffcccc"
| 1
| April 12
| @ Philadelphia
| L 70–82
| Lee Knorek (20)
| Philadelphia Arena
| 0–1
|- align="center" bgcolor="#ffcccc"
| 2
| April 14
| Philadelphia
| L 53–72
| Tommy Byrnes (11)
| Madison Square Garden III
| 0–2
|-

Player statistics

Season

Transactions

Trades

Sales

References

External links
 Knicks on Database Basketball
 Knicks on Basketball Reference

New York Knicks seasons
New York
New York Knicks
New York Knicks
1940s in Manhattan
Madison Square Garden